Ricardo Jorge da Luz Horta (born 15 September 1994) is a Portuguese professional footballer who plays as a right winger for Primeira Liga club Braga and the Portugal national team.

He spent most of his career with Braga after coming through Benfica's youth academy, playing more than 300 games for the former and scoring a club record 105 goals while winning the 2020–21 Taça de Portugal and the 2019–20 Taça da Liga. In the Primeira Liga, he also represented Vitória de Setúbal, and spent two years with Málaga in La Liga.

Horta finished second with Portugal at the 2015 European Under-21 Championship, also being an international at various youth levels. He made his debut with the full side in 2014, being selected for the 2022 World Cup.

Club career

Vitória Setúbal
Born in Sobreda, Almada, Horta joined Vitória de Setúbal's youth ranks in 2011, signing from Benfica. On 7 April 2013, he made his first-team and Primeira Liga debut, coming on as a second-half substitute for Cristiano in a 2–1 away loss against Rio Ave. He finished the campaign with six games, all from the bench.

On 9 December 2013, Horta scored his first professional goal, the game's only against Académica de Coimbra. He was a regular starter in his second season, playing 28 matches and scoring seven times.

Málaga
On 12 July 2014, Horta signed a five-year deal with La Liga side Málaga. He made his debut in the competition on 23 August, starting in a 1–0 home win over Athletic Bilbao.

Horta scored his first goal for on 6 January 2015, in a 2–0 defeat of Levante in the round of 16 of the Copa del Rey also at La Rosaleda Stadium. He finished his spell with 56 appearances in all competitions.

Braga
On 5 July 2016, Horta was loaned to Braga for one year. Roughly one year later he joined the club permanently, with Juan Carlos moving in the opposite direction. He scored 11 and eight goals in his second and third seasons respectively, helping to consecutive fourth-place finishes.

In September 2019, Horta added two more seasons to his contract to take him through to 2024, while increasing his buyout clause from €25 million to €30 million. The following 25 January, he scored the only goal in the last seconds of the final of the Taça da Liga against Porto. He set the club's record for goals in European competition on 10 December in a 2–0 home win over Zorya Luhansk in the group stage of the UEFA Europa League, surpassing Paulinho; both players had recently moved past Alan in that chart.

Horta closed the 2–0 defeat of Benfica in the final of the Taça de Portugal on 23 May 2021, to claim the cup competition for the third time in club history. On 3 August, Braga announced the player had rejected the chance to join Major League Soccer side Atlanta United following a bid worth €15 million; his contract with the Minho Province team was extended to 2026 in October.

In 2021–22, Horta became captain after Fransérgio's move to Bordeaux, and had his most prolific season with 19 goals, bettered in the division by only Darwin Núñez and Mehdi Taremi. On 25 April, he scored the only goal against Porto, preventing the visitors from taking the outright European record of 59 league games unbeaten. It was also the 100th of his professional career, and he took the Player of the Month and Forward of the Month award, with two teammates taking the equivalents for other positions as well as manager Carlos Carvalhal. On 15 May, he scored in the first minute of a 3–2 loss at neighbours Famalicão on the final day, thus moving ahead of 1940s player Mário Laranjo as Braga's top scorer with 93.

In the summer of 2022, Horta was linked with a move back to Benfica. Málaga, while admitting they rejected a €3 million offer for their undisclosed share in the player's economic rights, spoke of legal action against Braga for not selling him. He scored his 100th goal for the latter on 10 November, opening an eventual 2–1 home win over Moreirense in the fourth round of the domestic cup.

International career
Horta was part of the Portugal under-20 team at the 2014 Toulon Tournament and the under-21 one at the 2015 and 2017 UEFA European Championship. He scored in his only appearance in the 2015 competition, in a final runner-up position in the Czech Republic.

On 7 September 2014, Horta earned his first cap for the full side – one week before his 20th birthday – replacing William Carvalho early into the second half of a 0–1 home loss against Albania for the UEFA Euro 2016 qualifiers.

In May 2022, after almost eight years in the international wilderness, he was recalled by Fernando Santos for upcoming 2022–23 UEFA Nations League games, playing 20 minutes in the 1–1 draw with Spain in Seville on 2 June and scoring his team's goal. In November, he was named in the final squad for the 2022 FIFA World Cup in Qatar. As the nation had already secured qualification from their group, he started in the last fixture, opening an eventual 2–1 loss to South Korea in Al Rayyan following a cross from Diogo Dalot.

Personal life
Horta's younger brother, André, is also a footballer. He was a teammate at Benfica, Vitória de Setúbal and Braga.

Career statistics

Club

International

Scores and results list Portugal's goal tally first, score column indicates score after each Horta goal.

Honours
Braga
Taça de Portugal: 2020–21
Taça da Liga: 2019–20; runner-up: 2016–17, 2020–21

Portugal
UEFA European Under-21 Championship runner-up: 2015

Individual
Primeira Liga Forward of the Month: January 2020, February 2022, April 2022
Primeira Liga Player of the Month: January 2020, April 2022
Primeira Liga Team of the Year: 2021–22

References

External links

1994 births
Living people
Sportspeople from Almada
Portuguese footballers
Association football wingers
Primeira Liga players
Vitória F.C. players
S.C. Braga players
La Liga players
Málaga CF players
Portugal youth international footballers
Portugal under-21 international footballers
Portugal international footballers
2022 FIFA World Cup players
Portuguese expatriate footballers
Expatriate footballers in Spain
Portuguese expatriate sportspeople in Spain